Thrincophora is a genus of moths belonging to the subfamily Tortricinae of the family Tortricidae.

Species
Thrincophora archboldi Diakonoff, 1952
Thrincophora cinefacta (Turner, 1945)
Thrincophora deloptycha Diakonoff, 1952
Thrincophora dryinodes (Meyrick, 1910)
Thrincophora impletana (Walker, 1863)
Thrincophora inconcisana (Walker, 1863)
Thrincophora leucotorna Diakonoff, 1952
Thrincophora lignigerana (Walker, 1863)
Thrincophora microtera Diakonoff, 1952
Thrincophora nebulosa Diakonoff, 1952
Thrincophora ochracea Diakonoff, 1944
Thrincophora ostracopis (Meyrick, 1938)
Thrincophora signigerana (Walker, 1863)
Thrincophora stenoptycha (Turner, 1926)

See also
List of Tortricidae genera

References

 , 1881, Proc. Linn. Soc. N.S. W. 6: 430.
 , 2005, World Catalogue of Insects 5.

External links
tortricidae.com

Archipini
Tortricidae genera